Pershing Square may refer to:

Pershing Square (Los Angeles), a plaza in Los Angeles
Pershing Square, Manhattan
Pershing Square Capital Management
Pershing Square Foundation, a private family foundation ran by the CEO of Pershing Square Capital Management
Pershing Square Building in Manhattan
Pershing Square Viaduct, another name for the Park Avenue Viaduct, Manhattan
Pershing Square (train), a named passenger train of the New York, New Haven and Hartford Railroad, see List of named passenger trains of the United States (N–R)
Pershing Square Cafe in Manhattan – see Pershing Square, Manhattan